Next of Kin are an English pop rock band from Braintree, Essex, composed of brothers Nathan (drums), Mark (guitar) and Kieran Bass (bass guitar).

History

Discovery and record deal 
The band was discovered when the brothers visited the Musical Exchanges music shop in Birmingham, after an event at the nearby NEC had been cancelled.  Shop owner Gary Chapman was impressed by Mark's guitar playing and put them in touch with Universal Music. They subsequently signed a record deal with Universal Records.

Early career 
The band performed on the Smash Hits tour in 1998 and supported Boyzone on their UK tour in 1999. Their most notable single was "24 Hours from You", which was co-written by Richard Drummie of Go West, and helped by a promotional video shot in South Africa, and an appearance on the ITV television show Mad for It. It reached #13 on the UK Singles Chart in February 1999. Their follow-up release, "More Love", peaked at #33 in June that year.

At the time of their first single they received comparisons with Hanson, with their ages ranging from 13 to 18 when they broke through in 1999.

Later work 
In 2012, the brothers went to Los Angeles to record with Hollywood actor Stephen Dorff and his composer/producer father Steve Dorff. They recorded an album at NRG Recording Studios, California, with guest musicians John JR Robinson on drums, Leland Sklar on bass, Michael Landau on guitar, George Deoring on acoustic guitar, and Jimmy Nichols on keyboards. In 2013 they auditioned for the tenth series of The X Factor, but they were cut at Bootcamp.

Discography
1999: "24 Hours from You" - Universal Records - UK #13
1999: "More Love" - Universal Records - UK #33

References

External links
 

English boy bands
Music in Essex
Musical groups from Essex